Everson Fernando Gomes, commonly known as Gomes, (born 18 September 1993, in São Paulo) is a Brazilian footballer who plays for Prudentópolis as a defensive midfielder.

Career
Participated in partnership with the Flamengo-SP in 2011. In 2012, the steering wheel was on the staff Corinthians in the Copa São Paulo de Futebol Júnior 2012.

Honours

Youth
Corinthians
 Copa São Paulo de Futebol Júnior: 2012

Brazil U-20
 8 Nations International Tournament: 2012

Statistics

External links
 Player profile at corinthians.com 

Living people
1993 births
Brazilian footballers
Sport Club Corinthians Paulista players
Guaratinguetá Futebol players
Association football midfielders
Footballers from São Paulo